The Susannah Clarke Cottage is a historic building in Savannah, Georgia, United States. It is located at 517 East York Street, in the southwestern corner of Greene Square, in the Savannah Historic District. It was built for Susannah R. Clarke at some point between 1801 and 1808.

Historian and preservationist Mary Lane Morrison found the building to be of significant status. It is also listed in The National Trust's Guide to Savannah, which notes that it was one of many Savannah houses built low to the ground "with a rustic add-on porch or front gallery."

See also
Buildings in Savannah Historic District

References

Houses in Savannah, Georgia
Houses completed in 1808
Greene Square (Savannah) buildings
Savannah Historic District